The 1963 San Francisco Giants season was the Giants' 81st year in Major League Baseball, their sixth year in San Francisco since their move from New York following the 1957 season, and their fourth at Candlestick Park. The team finished in third place in the National League with an 88–74 record, 11 games behind the Los Angeles Dodgers.

Offseason 
 November 30, 1962: Manny Mota and Dick LeMay were traded by the Giants to the Houston Colt .45s for Joey Amalfitano.
 December 15, 1962: Stu Miller, Mike McCormick, and John Orsino were traded by the Giants to the Baltimore Orioles for Jack Fisher, Jimmie Coker and Billy Hoeft.

Regular season

Season standings

Record vs. opponents

Opening Day starters 
Felipe Alou
Orlando Cepeda
Jim Davenport
Tom Haller
Chuck Hiller
Willie Mays
Willie McCovey
José Pagán
Jack Sanford

Notable transactions 
 August 8, 1963: Norm Larker was purchased by the Giants from the Milwaukee Braves.

Roster

Season summary

July 2: A four-hour and ten minute pitching duel between Juan Marichal and Warren Spahn ends with Willie Mays hitting a home run in the bottom of the 16th inning, the SF Giants winning 1-0.

Player stats

Batting

Starters by position 
Note: Pos = Position; G = Games played; AB = At bats; H = Hits; Avg. = Batting average; HR = Home runs; RBI = Runs batted in

Other batters 
Note: G = Games played; AB = At bats; H = Hits; Avg. = Batting average; HR = Home runs; RBI = Runs batted in

Pitching

Starting pitchers 
Note: G = Games pitched; IP = Innings pitched; W = Wins; L = Losses; ERA = Earned run average; SO = Strikeouts

Other pitchers 
Note: G = Games pitched; IP = Innings pitched; W = Wins; L = Losses; ERA = Earned run average; SO = Strikeouts

Relief pitchers 
Note: G = Games pitched; W = Wins; L = Losses; SV = Saves; ERA = Earned run average; SO = Strikeouts

Awards and honors 
Willie Mays, All-Star Game Most Valuable Player
All-Star Game
Ed Bailey, catcher, starter
Willie Mays, outfield, starter
Orlando Cepeda, reserve
Juan Marichal, reserve
Willie McCovey, reserve

Farm system

Notes

References 
 1963 San Francisco Giants team at Baseball-Reference
 1963 San Francisco Giants team page at Baseball Almanac

San Francisco Giants seasons
San Francisco Giants season
San Fran